Kuwait competed at the 2012 Summer Paralympics in London, United Kingdom from August 29 to September 9, 2012.

Athletics 

Men’s Track and Road Events

Men’s Field Events

Wheelchair Fencing 

Men

See also

 Kuwait at the 2012 Summer Olympics

References

Nations at the 2012 Summer Paralympics
2012
2012 in Kuwaiti sport